Haemogregarina is a genus of haemoprotozoans, parasitic mainly on cold-blooded vertebrates. They are unicellular organisms which are parasitic in the red blood cells. Haemogregarina infects lower vertebrates (fish and reptiles) as intermediate hosts and leeches (as definitive hosts).

History
It was described in 1885 by Danilewsky from the European pond turtle (Emys orbicularis).

General description
These parasites are generally considered non-pathogenic, and have been described in the red blood cells of desert tortoises. They are elongate to fusiform oval organisms found in the red blood cells. Although the size varies, they are larger than the cell's nucleus. The organism stains a basophilic colour and has a surrounding clear zone.

Species
The following species are recognised:

Haemogregarina acanthoclini Laird, 1953
Haemogregarina anarhichadis Henry, 1912
Haemogregarina balistapi
Haemogregarina bettencourti França, 1908
Haemogregarina bigemina Laveran & Mesnil, 1901
Haemogregarina blanchardi Brumpt & Lebailly, 1904
Haemogregarina bothi Lebailly, 1905
Haemogregarina carchariasi Laveran, 1908
Haemogregarina clavata Neumann, 1909
Haemogregarina coelorhynchi Laird, 1952
Haemogregarina cotti Brumpt & Lebailly, 1904
Haemogregarina curvata Hayes, Smit, Seddon, Wertheim & Davies, 2006
Haemogregarina dakarensis Léger & Leger, 1920
Haemogregarina dasyatis Saunders, 1958
Haemogregarina delagei Laveran & Mesnil, 1901
Haemogregarina gobii Brumpt & Lebailly, 1904
Haemogregarina gobionis Franchini & Saini, 1923
Haemogregarina hartochi Kohl-Yakimoff & Yakimoff, 1915
Haemogregarina hemiscyllii Mackerras & Mackerras, 1961
Haemogregarina heterodontii von Prowazek, 1910
Haemogregarina hoplichthys Laird, 1952
Haemogregarina johnstoni Davis & Merrett, 2000
Haemogregarina koppiensis Smit & Davies, 2001
Haemogregarina laternae Lebailly, 1904
Haemogregarina leptocotti Hill & Hendrickson, 1991
Haemogregarina leptoscopi Laird, 1952
Haemogregarina lobiani Yakimov & Kohl-Yakimov, 1912 emend Levine, 1985
Haemogregarina londoni Yakimov & Kohl-Yakimov, 1912
Haemogregarina marzinowskii Yakimov & Kohl-Yakimov, 1912
Haemogregarina mavori Laird & Bullock, 1969
Haemogregarina minuta Neumann, 1909
Haemogregarina myoxocephali Fantham, Porter & Richardson, 1942
Haemogregarina parmae Mackerras & Mackerras, 1925
Haemogregarina platessae Lebailly, 1904
Haemogregarina polypartita Neumann, 1909
Haemogregarina quadrigemina Brumpt & Lebailly, 1904
Haemogregarina roelofsi Hill & Hendrickson, 1991
Haemogregarina rubrimarensis Saunders, 1960
Haemogregarina sachai Kirmse, 1978
Haemogregarina salariasi Laird, 1951
Haemogregarina scorpaenae Neumann, 1909
Haemogregarina simondi Laveran & Mesnil, 1901
Haemogregarina tetraodontis Mackerras & Mackerras, 1961
Haemogregarina torpedinis Neumann, 1909
Haemogregarina wladimirovi Yakimov & Kohl-Yakimov, 1912
Haemogregarina yakimovikohli Wladimiroff, 1910 emend Levine, 1985

References

Apicomplexa genera